Suero, also referred to as suero costeño or suero atollabuey, is a fermented-milk-based condiment from Colombia's Caribbean coastal region. It is somewhat similar to yogurt or sour cream. It is served as an accompaniment for various dishes and snacks. It is believed to be introduced by Arab Colombians, as a local adaptation of labneh.

See also
Colombian cuisine
Queso costeño
Arroz de lisa
Butifarra Soledeñas
Bollo
Jocoque

References

External links
 Suero recipe

Colombian cuisine
Condiments